Proscutum is a genus of sea snails, the true limpets, marine gastropod mollusks in the family Patellidae.

Species
 † Proscutum compressum (Deshayes, 1861) 
 † Proscutum deretranum Lozouet, 1999

References

External links
 Fischer, P. (1880-1887). Manuel de conchyliologie et de paléontologie conchyliologique, ou histoire naturelle des mollusques vivants et fossiles suivi d'un Appendice sur les Brachiopodes par D. P. Oehlert. Avec 23 planches contenant 600 figures dessinées par S. P. Woodward.. Paris: F. Savy. Published in 11 parts (fascicules), xxiv + 1369 pp., 23 pls
 MacClintock C. (1963). Reclassification of gastropod Proscutum Fischer based on muscle scars and shell structure. Journal of Paleontology. 37(1): 141-156.

Patellidae
Gastropod genera